Wang Yafan and Xu Yifan were the defending champions, but both players chose to participate in Anning and Madrid instead, respectively. 

Top seeds Eri Hozumi and Miyu Kato won the title, defeating Hiroko Kuwata and Ayaka Okuno in an all-Japanese final, 6–1, 6–2.

Seeds

Draw

References 
 Draw

Kangaroo Cup - Doubles
2016 in Japanese tennis
Kangaroo Cup